Matilde Sánchez Elías (24 March 1924 – 1 November 1988), known by her stage name La Torcacita, was a Mexican singer.

Discography

Compilation albums 
 15 éxitos de Matilde Sánchez "La Torcacita", versiones originales (RCA/Ariola, 1986)
 3 voces inolvidables de la canción ranchera: La Torcacita, La Consentida, La Panchita (Sony, 2013)
 XEW, la Voz de la América Latina desde México, presenta a Matilde Sánchez "La Torcacita" (Peerless, 2014)

References

External links 
 

Ranchera singers
1924 births
1988 deaths
Singers from Jalisco
20th-century Mexican women singers